Paladin were a British progressive rock band which released two albums on the Bronze Records label.

Career
They were founded 1970 by classically trained multi-instrumentalist Peter Solley and jazz drummer Keith Webb, two members of Terry Reid's band which was part of the opening act for the Rolling Stones on their 1969 American tour. The other members of the band were Derek Foley (guitar and vocals) who previously played in Grisby Dyke; Lou Stonebridge (keyboards and vocals) from Glass Menagerie, which had released five progressive rock and psychedelic rock singles, and also the lead singer of Grisby Dyke; and Peter Beckett (bass guitar, vocals) who came from Liverpool-based Winston G and The Wicked, and later in the final incarnation of World of Oz.

They played in venues across the UK as they worked to develop their sound, performing a mix of rock, blues, soul, jazz, and Latin music. Paladin's use of dual keyboards also created a unique sound. These performances were noticed by Bronze Records (who also recorded Uriah Heep and Manfred Mann). On January 8, 1971, Paladin entered Olympic Studios in London to record their debut eponymous first album, produced by Philamore Lincoln. The reviews were good, but the sales were disappointing.

Despite the poor performance of Paladin, the band was allowed to record a second album, Charge! produced by Philamore Lincoln, engineered by Geoff Emerick at Apple Studios and released in 1972. The album is notable for the cover art by Roger Dean which unfortunately did not help sales. In 1972, Stonebridge and Foley left, and the band recruited guitar/vocalist Joe Jammer to replace them. The group finally disbanded near the end of 1972.

Peter Solley would later play in a variety of bands and acted as a producer. He played with Eric Clapton, Whitesnake and Procol Harum, playing keyboards opposite Gary Brooker, and did production work for Peter Frampton and Wreckless Eric. Keith Webb ran the Nag's Head, Stafford, where he hosted numerous famous and no-longer-so-famous Rock'n'Roll acts including Climax Band and Mark Knopfler's Dire Straits during their brief but brilliant fame around "Sultans of Swing" era. Keith had played with several big names and bands and every Friday night in the late 70's he jammed at Rock Workshop, Etruria; he ended up in Spain. Lou Stonebridge went to McGuinness Flint and later to David Byron (ex-Uriah Heep). Peter Beckett moved to the United States, founding Player and scoring a No. 1 hit called "Baby Come Back", co-written with J.C. Crowley, and later touring with the Little River Band. Derek Foley went on to play with Graham Bond.

The band recorded several jazz tracks which were finally released as Jazzatack in 2002.

Discography

Paladin, 1971

Track listing
Side One
 "Bad Times" - (Peter Solley) - 6:44
 "Carry Me Home" - (Lou Stonebridge, Pete Beckett) - 3:19
 "Dance of the Cobra" - (Keith Webb) - 7:37
Side Two
 "Third World" - (Solley) - 3:51
 "Fill Up Your Heart" - (Solley) - 5:32
 "Flying High" - (Solley) - 4:57
 "The Fakir" - (Lalo Schifrin) - 4:36

Personnel
 Derek Foley - guitar, vocals
 Lou Stonebridge - piano, vocals
 Peter Solley - organ, piano, violin, vocals
 Peter Beckett - bass, vocals
 Keith Webb - drums, percussion

Charge!, 1972

Track listing
Side One
 "Give Me Your Hand" - (Peter Solley) - 7:49
 "Well We Might" - (Solley) - 5:02
 "Get One Together" - (Keith Webb) - 2:36
 "Anyway" - (Solley) - 4:17
Side Two
 "Good Lord" - (Derek Foley, Lou Stonebridge, Peter Beckett) - 6:45
 "Mix Your Mind with the Moonbeams" - (Solley) - 6:00
 "Watching the World Pass By" - (Stonebridge) - 9:33

Personnel
 Lou Stonebridge - vocals, electric piano, harmonica
 Derek Foley - lead guitar, slide guitar, vocals
 Peter Solley - organ, violin, piano
 Peter Beckett - bass, vocals
 Keith Webb - drums, percussion

Jazzattack, 2002
 "The Gong" - (Keith Webb) - 0:13
 "The Fakir I" - (Lalo Schifrin) - 5:35
 "Third World - Part I" - (Peter Solley) - 5:39
 "Third World - Part II" - (Solley) - 3:02
 "Carry Me Home" - (Lou Stonebridge, Pete Beckett) - 4:49
 "Dance of the Cobra" - (Webb) - 7:42
 "Bad Times" - (Solley) - 7:14
 "Fill Up Your Heart" - (Solley) - 5:42
 "It's Time" - (Solley, Webb, Stonebridge, Beckett, Derek Foley) - 4:28
 "The Fakir II" - (Lalo Schifrin) - 5:01
Bonus Tracks:
 "Trip to Venus" - (Solley)
 "Anyway I" - (Solley)
 "Anyway II" - (Solley)

Personnel
 Lou Stonebridge - vocals, electric piano, harmonica
 Derek Foley - lead guitar, slide guitar, vocals
 Peter Solley - organ, violin, piano
 Peter Beckett - bass, vocals
 Keith Webb - drums, percussion

References

External links
 

British progressive rock groups
Musical groups established in 1970
Musical groups disestablished in 1973
Bronze Records artists